Bunkeflostrand is a suburb of Malmö and a locality situated in Malmö Municipality, Skåne County, Sweden with 15,212 inhabitants in 2021.

Bunkeflostrand is situated near the Oresund Bridge, 7.74 km south of Malmö City Centre, with which it is nearly, but not completely, conjoined. The eastern part of Bunkeflostrand consists of Annestad, an area with apartments.

References

Neighbourhoods of Malmö
Populated places in Malmö Municipality
Populated places in Skåne County